Czechoslovak War Cross may refer to:

 Czechoslovak War Cross 1918
 Czechoslovak War Cross 1939–1945